Alan Jeffreys (17 April 1913 – 3 November 1943) was an Australian cricketer. He played four first-class matches for Western Australia between 1937/38 and 1939/40.

References

External links
 

1913 births
1943 deaths
Australian cricketers
Australian expatriate sportspeople in England
Western Australia cricketers
Cricketers from Perth, Western Australia
Royal Australian Air Force personnel of World War II
Australian military personnel killed in World War II